Jorge Moll Filho (born January 23, 1946) is a Brazilian cardiologist and entrepreneur. He founded Rede D'Or, which is one of the largest Brazilian hospital and lab operators.

In 1977, at the age of 33, Jorge Moll Filho started acquiring clinics and laboratories in Rio de Janeiro. Soon, he established the Cardiolab diagnostic clinic group that annually brought him a great fortune. In 1994, Jorge Moll Filho bought the former Copa D'Or hotel in Copacabana and transformed it into a  private hospital of the same name. In 1998, he purchased the hotel in Barra da Tijuca and opened the Barra D'Or hospital. In 2014, he became a billionaire and by that time, he owned the majority of medical facilities in Rio de Janeiro. In 2015, Rede D'Or bought the rival healthcare group Sao Luiz. The Rede D’Or Sao Luiz’ focus is on supplying medical treatment with a specialisation in oncology, neurology, cardiology, gynacology and dermatology. Moll owns 72% of the company, while the other 23% is owned by the investment bank BTG Pactual.

Jorge Moll Filho made the 2022 Forbes Billionaires List with an estimated wealth of $9.8 billion and occupied the 206th position.

References 

1946 births
Living people
Brazilian businesspeople
Brazilian billionaires
20th-century Brazilian businesspeople
21st-century Brazilian businesspeople